Erik Ludvigsen Pontoppidan (24 August 1698 – 20 December 1764) was a Danish author, a Lutheran bishop of the Church of Norway, an historian, and an antiquarian. His Catechism of the Church of Denmark heavily influenced Danish and Norwegian religious thought and practice for roughly the next 200 years after its 1737 publication.

Biography
Pontoppidan was educated in Fredericia (1716–1718), after which he was a private tutor in Norway, and then studied in Holland, and in London and Oxford, England. In 1721 he became informator of Frederick Carl of Carlstein (later duke of Plön), and two years later morning preacher in the castle and afternoon preacher in Nordborg. From 1726 to 1734 he was pastor at Hagenberg, where he so protected the pietists as to find it advisable to defend his course against the Lutherans with Dialogus; oder Unterredung Severi, Sinceri, und Simplicis von der Religion and Reinheit der Lehre (1726) and Heller Glaubensspiegel (1727). During this same period he laid the foundation of his later topographical and historical works in Memoria Hafniæ (1729); Theatrum Daniæ (1736); and the aforementioned Kurzgefasste Reformationshistorie der dänischen Kirche. Pontoppidan became successively pastor in Hillerød and castle preacher in Frederiksborg (1734), Danish court preacher at Copenhagen (1735), professor extraordinary of theology at the University (1738), and a member of the mission board (1740), meanwhile writing his Everriculum fermenti veteris (1736) and Böse Sprichwörter (1739).

In 1736 Pontoppidan was directed by royal rescript to prepare an explanation of the catechism and a new hymnal, and through these two works — Sandhed til gudfrygtighed (1737) and the hymnbook (1740) — the pietistic cause in Denmark received powerful assistance. He likewise continued his historical investigations in his Marmora Danica (3 vols., 1739–1741; a collection of noteworthy epitaphs and ecclesiastical monuments) and his uncritical Annales ecclesiæ Danicæ (4 vols., 1741–1752); and also wrote a novel, Menoza (3 vols., 1742–1743), a critique of the religious conditions of Denmark and other countries. In 1747 he was appointed bishop at Bergen, where he introduced many educational reforms, and wrote Glossarium Norvagicum (1749) and Forsøk til Norges naturlige historie (Copenhagen, 1752–1753), while his pastoral letters formed in part the basis of his later Collegium pastorale practicum (1757). The antagonism which Pontoppidan roused at Bergen, however, obliged him to go in 1754 to Copenhagen, where he became prochancellor at the university in the following year. But all his plans in this capacity were thwarted by his opponents, and he sought consolation in writing, the results being his Origines Hafnienses (1760) and the first two parts of his Den danske Atlas (1763–1767), of which the last five volumes were edited posthumously. He was also active as a political economist, being the editor of Danmarks og Norges ökonomiske Magazin (8 vols., 1757–1764).

Sea serpents and giant squids
Pontoppidan argued for the existence of the sea serpent, the kraken and the mermaid in his two-volume work, Forsøk til Norges naturlige historie (The Natural History of Norway), published in 1752 and 1753.

Herman Melville, in his novel Moby-Dick, talks about "the great Kraken of Bishop Pontoppodan".

Jules Verne, in his novel Twenty Thousand Leagues Under the Seas, references this aspect of Pontoppidan's work. The narrator, Professor Aronnax, explains that "another bishop, Pontoppidan of Bergen, also tells of a devilfish so large a whole cavalry regiment could maneuver on it." Despite the skepticism of his companions, they soon encounter "a squid of colossal dimensions." See, also, his The Sea Serpent.

Influence 
Pontoppidan's Heller Glaubensspiegel was an influence on Swedish Lutheran lay preacher Carl Olof Rosenius, impressing upon him the importance of conversion and having a living faith.

Notes

References

External links

 

1698 births
1764 deaths
Danish Lutheran bishops
Danish ornithologists
Pontopiddan, Erik
Bishops of Bjørgvin
18th-century Lutheran bishops
People from Aarhus
18th-century Danish scientists
18th-century Norwegian clergy